Runic Games was a Seattle-based American computer game company formed by Travis Baldree (creator of Fate), Max Schaefer and Erich Schaefer (co-founders of Blizzard North, creators of Diablo), Peter Hu, and the Flagship Studios Seattle team responsible for Mythos. It was a subsidiary of Perfect World. In 2009, the company released Torchlight, a single-player action role-playing game. They released a sequel, Torchlight II, in 2012. It was at this time the developers revealed they were no longer pursuing plans to create an MMO in the Torchlight universe.

History
Runic Games was founded on August 11, 2008, by Travis Baldree, Max Schaefer, Erich Schaefer, and Peter Hu. Originally, the company was incorporated with the placeholder name "Surprise Truck", as suggested by Max Schaefer. The naming resulted in the company receiving a multitude of calls asking whether they were available to do truck delivery jobs. Runic Games was formed specifically for the purpose of keeping the team behind the game Mythos together to develop a new action RPG video game as a "spiritual successor" to their previous project. Following the dissolution of Flagship Studios in 2008, all 14 members of the Seattle team that developed Mythos signed onto Runic Games.

Full production on the game started around November 2008, meaning that the game's total development period was approximately 11 months. At the 2009 Game Developers Conference some members of the Runic Games team were present with an early version of their single-player game, at which point it was revealed that the title would be Torchlight. One notable addition to the staff was Matt Uelmen, composer for Blizzard Entertainment's Diablo series. As of mid-2009, the company employed no fewer than 26 people.

Gamasutra named Runic Games one of its "Top 5 Developers" of 2009 for the studio's ability to create the "highly-polished" Torchlight in only 11 months. The company was also praised for its responsiveness to its player community, citing one particular incident:

Following the 2009 release of Torchlight, the studio shifted to the production of a sequel Torchlight II.

In 2010, Perfect World Entertainment, Inc. bought an $8.4 million majority stake in Runic Games.

In March 2014, co-founder Erich Schaefer and Travis Baldree decided to leave Runic and form a new indie studio, Double Damage Games.

Max Schaefer left the studio in early 2016; he then founded Echtra Games, which included a number of former Blizzard and Runic developers. In August 2018, Echtra announced Torchlight Frontiers, a shared world game build on the Torchlight IP.

On November 3, 2017, Perfect World announced the closure of Runic Games, along with large layoffs at Motiga. Perfect World said the closure was to reflect their company's focus on games as a service. One set of developers from Runic, including Marsh Lefler, Patrick Blank, Allen Fong, and John Dunbar, along with former Gearbox Software members, established Monster Squad Games and are currently developing a player-versus-environment cooperative game.

Games

Torchlight (2009)

Runic Games' first product is Torchlight, a single-player action role-playing game published by Perfect World Entertainment, Inc. and Encore, Inc, and released for Windows on October 27, 2009. The fantasy-themed game is set in the fictional town of Torchlight and the expansive caverns and dungeons nearby, which adventurers explore to collect valuable loot and battle hordes of monsters. Following the initial digital distribution release, Encore, Inc published a Windows retail box version in January 2010, a port for Mac OS X was developed by World Domination Industries and released through Steam in May 2010, and it was released for the Xbox 360 via XBLA on March 9, 2011. The game was met with a generally positive critical reception, holding a Metacritic score of 83 based on 57 reviews.

Torchlight II (2012)

Runic Games announced Torchlight II, a sequel that features multiplayer co-op. The company decided to develop the sequel to "give [the players] what they're asking for" in terms of a multiplayer experience, while serving as an intermediate step toward their planned MMORPG. Torchlight II was released on September 20, 2012.

Though not listed anywhere in their marketing materials, Torchlight II requires a Runic Games account to play in Internet Multiplayer games.

Hob (2017)

Runic Games announced Hob on August 17, 2015.

Hob is set on a beautiful and dangerous unknown world, with buzzing life above and the whirrs of mysterious machinery below. The more players delve into the world's design, the more they uncover a planet in peril. Players must learn to survive, understand their true purpose through acquiring skills, and ultimately transform the nature of the world itself.

"Hob is presented without text or dialogue. Narrative is revealed as players explore and interact with their mysterious planet, and the strange life forms that inhabit it. Hob features smooth controller gameplay, multi-layered puzzles, and striking visuals".

Hob was released on September 26, 2017.

References

External links
 

Perfect World (company)
Defunct video game companies of the United States
Video game companies established in 2008
Video game companies disestablished in 2017
2010 mergers and acquisitions
Video game development companies
Defunct companies based in Seattle
American subsidiaries of foreign companies
2008 establishments in Washington (state)
2017 disestablishments in Washington (state)